John Sexton is an American fine art photographer who specializes in black and white traditional analog photography.

Life
John Sexton was born in 1953.  Education: Bachelor of Arts, cum laude, departmental honors, Art – Photography, Chapman University, Orange, California; Associate of Arts, with honors, Photography, Cypress College, Cypress, California

Career
Sexton worked for Ansel Adams from 1979 to 1984 (when Adams died), first as Technical and Photographic Assistant, then as Technical Consultant. Sexton served as Special Projects Consultant to the Ansel Adams Publishing Rights Trust following Adams' death.

Sexton has taught at numerous photographic workshops in the past, and continues to do so, with his wife Anne Larsen, a talented photographer in her own right, through his long-running eponymous fine art photography workshop program.  For many years he was a co-director of the  Owens Valley Photography Workshops with fellow co-directors Bruce Barnbaum and Ray McSavaney. 

Sexton also  has lectured at many museums and universities. His work is in numerous permanent collections and exhibitions, and he has been the subject of many articles in the photographic press.

Style
Sexton's process consists of large-format 4x5 photography and black and white silver gelatin prints. Like his mentor Ansel Adams, his prints 
are characterized by great tonal quality resulting from his darkroom virtuosity - Sexton provides abundant technical notes in his books. Most of Sexton's subjects are the natural world, however, unlike Adams, he is more interested in intimate scenes than wide or dramatic vistas, and often photographs them in long exposures made in the "quiet" light of dusk.

Honors and awards
 International Photography Hall of Fame inductee, St. Louis, Missouri, 2018
Telly Award - Bronze, for Videography/Cinematography, Epson America's video production, John Sexton: Print Your Legacy, 2018
 George Eastman Medal, Beijing, China, 2014
 American Society of Photographers, International Award, 2014
SAPPI Award - Silver for Recollections: Three Decades of Photographs, 2007
 North American Nature Photography Association, Lifetime Achievement Award, 2005
 Kodak Professional Icon, 2004
 Kodak Professional Legend Online, 2000
 Cypress College, Thirtieth Anniversary Outstanding Alumnus. 1997
 Photographic Book of the Year Awards, First Place Monograph: Listen to the Trees, 1994
 Honorary Master of Science, Brooks Institute of Photography, 1990
 Imogen Cunningham Award, 1981

Publications
The following books of John Sexton's work have been published:

 Recollections: Three Decades of Photographs, 2006. 
 Places of Power: The Aesthetics of Technology, 2000. 
 Listen to the Trees, 1994.  
 Quiet Light, 1990.

Major Exhibitions
John Sexton: Twenty Years of Photographs, major retrospective exhibition, Monterey Peninsula Museum of Art.
Quiet Light, traveling exhibition organized by the United States Information Agency, toured in fifteen countries in Europe, 1994 to 1996
Evolutions, International Center of Photography, New York City, 1991.

Selected One Person Exhibitions
 International Center of Photography, New York, NY
Monterey Museum of Art, Monterey, CA
Center for Photographic Art, Carmel, CA
 Clarence Kennedy Gallery, Polaroid Corporation, Cambridge, MA
 Polaroid Corporation Cambridge, MA
 The Weston Gallery, Carmel, CA
 Photo Gallery International, Tokyo, Japan
 Focus Gallery, San Francisco, CA
 The Afterimage Gallery, Dallas, TX
 Photokina, Cologne, Germany
 Alinder Gallery, Gualala, CA
 Folio Gallery, Calgary, Canada
 The Ansel Adams Gallery, Yosemite National Park, CA
 Susan Spiritus Gallery, Costa Mesa, CA
 The Friends of Photography, Carmel, CA
 Kathleen Ewing Gallery, Washington, D.C.

References

External links
 John Sexton's website
 http://www.pdngallery.com/legends/sexton/
 http://www.brainyquote.com/quotes/authors/j/john_sexton.html
 https://web.archive.org/web/20061101055027/http://www.anseladams.com/content/contemp_photographers/johnsexton_intro.html
 http://www.photovisionmagazine.com/articles/sexton.html
 http://www.dearnogallery.com/artist_detail.php?id=18
 http://www.johnpaulcaponigro.com/lib/artists/sexton.php

Living people
1953 births
American photographers
Chapman University alumni
Fine art photographers